The 1994 Iowa Hawkeyes football team represented the University of Iowa in the 1994 NCAA Division I-A football season as a member of the Big Ten Conference. The team was coached by Hayden Fry and played their home games at Kinnick Stadium.

Schedule

Roster

Game summaries

Central Michigan

Sources: Box score

Iowa State

Sources: Box score and Game recap

Penn State

Sources: Box score and Game recap

Oregon

Sources: Box score and Game recap

Michigan

Sources: Box score and Game recap

Indiana

Illinois

Michigan State

Sources: Box score and Game recap

Purdue

Sources: Box score and Game recap

Northwestern

Sources: Box score and Game recap

The 49–13 victory was Iowa's 21st consecutive over Northwestern. Freshman QB Matt Sherman, starting for the first time at Iowa, completed 19 of 24 passes for 331 yards and 3 touchdowns.

Minnesota

Sources: Box score and Game recap

The Hawkeyes won a high-scoring matchup at the Metrodome to salvage a .500 season.

Awards and honors

Team players in the 1995 NFL Draft

References

Iowa
Iowa Hawkeyes football seasons
Iowa Hawkeyes football